Mr. Ouch is a hazard symbol developed by the US’s National Electrical Manufacturers Association (NEMA) to represent electrical hazards. Unlike other high-voltage warning symbols, Mr. Ouch was specifically designed with young children in mind.

Mr. Ouch is similar in name, purpose, and appearance to the UPMC Children's Hospital of Pittsburgh's "Mr. Yuk" design used to label poisonous substances, although the two symbols were developed independently.

Appearance

Mr. Ouch is anthropomorphized electricity. The design shows a snarling, spiderlike creature with jagged, lightning-bolt arms throwing a child backwards.

History

In early 1981, several member companies of NEMA began studying how to prevent young children from being electrocuted by electrical transformers. This followed incidents where transformer cabinets were vandalized or left unlocked, allowing access to the high-voltage equipment inside and resulting in disfigurement and death. NEMA realized that existing signage did not adequately convey the danger, either because it required literacy (text-only warnings) or because it was too abstract to register on a child (bolts of electricity).

Concerned about "failure to warn" lawsuits, NEMA began exploring ways of warning young children about the dangers of exposed high-voltage equipment. Member companies within NEMA's Transformer Section formed a task force—the Task Force on Safety Labels for Pad-Mounted Switchgear and Transformers Sited in Public Areas—to design a safety label that very young children would understand, as well as standards on how that label was to be used.

At the beginning of the project, the task force reached out to transformer manufacturers in an effort to build consensus for standardizing a design. NEMA hired the Agnew Moyer Smith company of Pittsburgh, PA to design the label, and the George R. Fraich Associates Testing Organization of Chicago to test children's reactions to it. NEMA began testing the first iterations of the design in late 1981, initially choosing sixteen different illustrations to test on children. The test groups were located in Chicago, IL and San Antonio, Texas, and consisted of an equal number of English and non-English-speaking children, aged 2.5 to 6 years old. From that group of sixteen illustrations, NEMA selected the four most successful designs and conducted a second round of user tests in early 1982, using a group of children located in Chicago and identical in age range and language. Of those four illustrations, the one children most strongly associated with danger was Mr. Ouch. A 1995 study presented at the annual meeting of the Human Factors and Ergonomics Society confirmed that Mr. Ouch most effectively suggested an electrical hazard, out of four other symbols.

Mr. Ouch was the first warning label system developed and standardized by an industry.

Usage

The Mr. Ouch design is owned by NEMA. Usage guidelines for the signage are specified in NEMA Standards Publication 260-1996, "Safety Labels for Pad-Mounted Switchgear and Transformers Sited in Public Areas". Mr. Ouch labels are typically applied to pad-mounted transformers. Label designs frequently include the signal words "Warning" or "Danger" in accordance with ANSI-Z535.

When first introduced in 1983, the Mr. Ouch design was not considered a replacement for OSHA warning signage, and had to accompany signage compliant with OSHA's existing ANSI-based standards in order to satisfy OSHA safety regulations. However, the Mr. Ouch label designs shown in the 1996 revision of NEMA-260 share many characteristics of OSHA's current ANSI-Z535-based safety standards—clear pictogram, caution symbol, and direct explanatory language—and NEMA-260-1996 does not specify that Mr. Ouch labels must be used in accordance with other signage.

Wisconsin Energies created an educational video for schools, to help children recognize Mr. Ouch.

See also
 Mr. Yuk
 Reddy Kilowatt
 Zax (Duke Power)

References 

Public service announcement characters
Children's health in the United States
Male characters in advertising
Pictograms
Occupational safety and health
Electrical safety
Symbols introduced in 1983